Niels Lund may refer to:
 Niels Lund, Danish professor in medieval history
 Niels Moeller Lund, Danish artist
 Niels Tønder Lund, Danish zoologist